James William Price (born 1945, Fort Worth, Texas, United States) is an American session musician. He toured extensively with The Rolling Stones from 1970 until 1973, including their 1972 American Tour, and appears on the albums Sticky Fingers, Exile on Main St. and Goats Head Soup. From September 1968 to February 1969, Price played with New Buffalo Springfield. He also toured and recorded with Delaney & Bonnie and Friends, Joe Cocker's Mad Dogs and Englishmen and Eric Clapton. Price played on several songs on Harry Nilsson's Nilsson Schmilsson.

Career
Price worked as a session musician, playing trombone and trumpet in the Los Angeles area. His work on the Delaney & Bonnie album Accept No Substitute (1969) led to touring with the band. He next appeared on Eric Clapton's self-titled solo album (1970). Also that year, he worked on All Things Must Pass with George Harrison and Mad Dogs and Englishmen with Joe Cocker. The next year he appeared on Barbra Streisand's album Barbra Joan Streisand. He also worked as a record producer in this period. During the 1980s and 1990s, Price composed music for numerous motion pictures, television programs and advertisements.

Albums produced by Price
Jim Price - Kids Nowadays Ain't Got No Shame (A&M)
Genya Ravan - They Love Me, They Love Me Not (ABC Dunhill)
Jim Price - Sundego's Traveling Orchestra (ABC Dunhill)
Jim Price - All Occasion Brass Band (MCA)
Joe Cocker - I Can Stand a Little Rain (A&M) (includes the single "You Are So Beautiful")
Joe Cocker - Jamaica Say You Will (A&M)
Wayne Shorter - Native Dancer (CBS), 1975
Jennifer Warnes - Jennifer Warnes (Arista)
KGB - KGB (MCA)
Hamilton, Joe Frank & Reynolds (Playboy), 1975
David Bromberg - Reckless Abandon (Fantasy)
Milton Nascimento - Journey to Dawn (A&M)

Television and film scores
Price orchestrated the underscoring for ABC Children's Weekend Specials (Asselin Productions). He also arranged, conducted, and produced the music score for the SHO Films production City Limits.

Price composed, arranged, conducted, and produced the music score for the MHE production Heated Vengeance. In addition he was the composer and music director for the ABC two-hour special All-Star Pro Sports Awards. Price also composed, arranged, and produced the music score for the MPCA feature film Hangfire''.

References

External links
[ Allmusic.com biography]

Living people
American trumpeters
American male trumpeters
American session musicians
Record producers from Texas
American film score composers
Dunhill Records artists
A&M Records artists
MCA Records artists
People from Fort Worth, Texas
Plastic Ono Band members
Delaney & Bonnie & Friends members
1945 births
American male film score composers